About Adam is a 2000 romantic comedy film written and directed by Gerard Stembridge and starring Kate Hudson, Stuart Townsend, and Frances O'Connor. The plot focuses on the effect a seductive young man has on four siblings.

Plot
Adam is a young Dubliner who ingratiates himself into the Owens family after meeting Lucy at the restaurant where she waits tables and sings. While wooing her, he becomes involved with her more reserved older sister Laura, a romantic literary type who spends most of her time at the library, her oldest married sister Alice, a new mother who is unhappy with her boring husband Martin, and her brother David, who seeks Adam's advice on how to seduce his repressed girlfriend, only to find himself nearly succumbing to Adam's charms himself.

Revisits are made to several scenes, each seen from the point-of-view of a different character.

Cast
Stuart Townsend ..... Adam
Kate Hudson ..... Lucy Owens
Frances O'Connor ..... Laura Owens
Rosaleen Linehan ..... Peggy Owens
Charlotte Bradley ..... Alice Owens Rooney
Alan Maher ..... David Owens
Brendan Dempsey ..... Martin Rooney

Production
Kate Hudson performs "The Man I Love" by George and Ira Gershwin, "You Do Something to Me" by Cole Porter, and "All the Way" by Sammy Cahn and Jimmy Van Heusen. During the closing credits, Peggy Lee performs "Sisters" by Irving Berlin.

The film premiered at the Sundance Film Festival in January 2000 and was shown at the Karlovy Vary Film Festival in the Czech Republic in July 2000 but wasn't released theatrically until it opened in Ireland in January 2001. It was given a very limited release in the U.S., where it grossed $159,668.

Critical reception
 

Stephen Holden of The New York Times said "Guilt-free and nearly devoid of erotic angst, About Adam is the flip side of movies like Teorema, Something for Everyone and those slogging Tennessee Williams dramas in which an irresistible, omnisexual stud is often an angel of death. Here he is an angel of sexual health in an impossibly euphoric world where sibling rivalry and sexual jealousy are only passing twinges of discomfort, not consuming passions. The movie's blissful spirits coincide with its portrait of modern, freshly-scrubbed-looking Dublin as the closest thing to Fun City the British isles have to offer nowadays."

Emanuel Levy of Variety called the film "smartly sexy," a "brightly observed narrative," and "a frolic free of any judgments ... marked by Stembridge's sparkling wit." He added, "Stembridge plays with shifting perspectives in a fresh manner that defies expectations of the romantic genre ... This literate ensembler is propelled by talent behind and in front of the camera. Townsend, who physically resembles the young Terence Stamp, is perfectly cast as the dark, spirited outsider. Rest of the mostly female cast is equally deft and attractive."

Maitland McDonagh of TV Guide rated it three out of four stars, calling it "sweet, likable and consistently engaging, if so insubstantial that it's always on the verge of blowing away" and adding, "Townsend pulls off the unenviable job of making Adam a chameleon-like seducer without allowing him to seem like a cad or a callous sexual opportunist ... Stembridge deftly balances genre expectations with just enough stylistic flourishes to make it feel surprisingly fresh. The movie starts to fade from memory as soon as it's over, but for an hour and a half it's a pleasantly diverting lark."

References

External links
 
 
 

2000 films
Irish romantic comedy-drama films
British romantic comedy-drama films
American romantic comedy-drama films
Films set in Dublin (city)
BBC Film films
2000 romantic comedy-drama films
2000s English-language films
English-language Irish films
2000s American films
2000s British films